Lloyd Thomson LVO (22 May 191926 August 2015) was an Australian public servant and diplomat. He also co-wrote the book and lyrics of the successful Australian musical The Sentimental Bloke.

In 1958 Queen Elizabeth II appointed him a Lieutenant of the Royal Victorian Order.  In 1983 he was awarded the Grand Cross of the Order of Pius IX, recognising his service as the inaugural Australian Ambassador to the Holy See (1973–74, 1980–83).

References

1919 births
2015 deaths
Ambassadors of Australia to Denmark
Ambassadors of Australia to Ireland
Ambassadors of Australia to the Holy See
Ambassadors of Australia to the Netherlands
Permanent Representatives of Australia to the United Nations Office in Geneva
University of Melbourne alumni
Australian Lieutenants of the Royal Victorian Order
Knights Grand Cross of the Order of Pope Pius IX
People from Footscray, Victoria
Public servants from Melbourne